Pasilobus bufoninus is a species of spider in the orb-weaver spider family Araneidae, found in Taiwan and Indonesia (Java and the Moluccas).

Taxonomy
Pasilobus bufoninus was first described by Eugène Simon in 1867, as Micrathena bufonina. In 1895, he transferred it to his new genus Pasilobus, of which it is the type species. Spiders from Japan that had been identified as Pasilobus bufoninus were shown in 2006 to be P. hupingensis, removing Japan from the distribution of P. bufoninus.

References

Araneidae
Spiders of Asia
Spiders described in 1867
Taxa named by Eugène Simon